Shabana Akhtar (born April 5, 1972) is an Olympic athlete from Pakistan. She became Pakistan's first woman to compete at the Olympics when she took part in the women's long jump at the 1996 Olympics.

She is a 42-time Pakistan national champion, having won the 100m and 200m dashes from 1989–1998, and from 1992–1998 the  400 metres, long jump, high jump, 4 × 100 m Relay and 4x400 Relay.

She represented Pakistan at the:
World Championships: 1993 (100 metres and 200 metres) and 1995 (100 metres)
South Asian Games: 1989, 1991, 1993, 1995
Women's Islamic Games: 1993, 1997
Women's International Games: 1998, 2001

References

Pakistani female long jumpers
Olympic athletes of Pakistan
Athletes (track and field) at the 1996 Summer Olympics
1972 births
Living people
South Asian Games gold medalists for Pakistan
South Asian Games medalists in athletics